Cedemon tristis is a species of beetle in the family Cerambycidae, and the only species in the genus Cedemon. It was described by Gahan in 1890.

References

Tragocephalini
Beetles described in 1890